Joe Bernard (born 1963) is an American football coach. He is the defensive coordinator at University at Albany, SUNY, a position he has held since 2018. Bernard served as the head football coach at Fairfield University in Fairfield, Connecticut from 2001 to 2002.

Early life and education
Bernard is from Parsippany-Troy Hills, New Jersey. He earned a degree in accounting at Moravian College, where he graduated in 1985. He then earned his master's degree in mathematics from East Stroudsburg University in 1988.

Coaching career
Bernard served as Fairfield football program's second-ever (and final) head coach behind his mentor, Kevin Kiesel. Bernard was the Stags' head coach for the 2001 and 2002 seasons – the final two years before Fairfield abandoned its football program.

He moved on to become defensive coordinator at Duquesne in 2003. He then served as coordinator until February 2005, at which point he was also promoted as interim head coach due to former head coach Greg Gattuso's decision to leave and coach at Pittsburgh. Bernard served simultaneously as the head coach and defensive coordinator of the Dukes for two months, at which time he was relieved of head coaching duties by Jerry Schmidt. In 2009, Bernard left Duquesne to take a position with the Pittsburgh Panthers as a coaching consultant.

Head coaching record

College

References

External links
 Albany profile

1963 births
Living people
Albany Great Danes football coaches
Duquesne Dukes football coaches
Fairfield Stags football coaches
Guilford Quakers football coaches
High school football coaches in Pennsylvania
High school football coaches in South Carolina
East Stroudsburg University of Pennsylvania alumni
Moravian University alumni
People from Allegheny County, Pennsylvania
People from Parsippany-Troy Hills, New Jersey
Coaches of American football from New Jersey